Moulmein Single Member Constituency was a constituency in Singapore. It used to exist from 1959 to 1988 as Moulmein Constituency and was renamed as Moulmein Single Member Constituency (SMC) as part of Singapore's political reforms. The SMC was merged into Kampong Glam Group Representation Constituency in 1991.

Member of Parliament

Elections

Elections in the 1950s

Elections in the 1960s

References 

Singaporean electoral divisions